Burgois is a hamlet in north Cornwall, England, United Kingdom situated approximately one mile south of Padstow. It is 5 miles west of the town of Wadebridge.

The hamlet has a pub, the Pickwick Inn, but no other community facilities. It is within the Church of England parish of St Issey and the St Issey and St Tudy division of Cornwall Council.

References

Hamlets in Cornwall